St Catherine's Church, Cossall is a Grade II* listed parish church in the Church of England in Cossall, Nottinghamshire, England.

History

The church dates from the 13th century and was rebuilt in 1842.

It is part of a joint parish with:
St Peter's Church, Awsworth
St Helen's Church, Trowell

The church is the burial place of George Willoughby, who founded the adjacent Willoughby Almshouses in 1685.

References

Church of England church buildings in Nottinghamshire
Grade II* listed churches in Nottinghamshire